Ananias son of Nedebeus (Hebrew: חנניה בן נדבאי Ḥananyá ben Nadváy "…(son of) the philanthropist") was a high priest who, according to the Acts of the Apostles, presided during the trials of the apostle Paul at Jerusalem (Acts 23:2) and Caesarea (Acts 24:1).

Josephus, Antiquities xx. 5. 2, called him "Ananias ben Nebedeus". He officiated as high priest from about AD 47 to 52. A. C. Hervey described him as "a violent, haughty, gluttonous, and rapacious man, and yet looked up to by the Jews".

Biblical account
In the narrative of the Acts of the Apostles, Paul was called to appear before the Jewish Sanhedrin, on the instructions of the commander of the Roman garrison in Jerusalem. Ananias heard Paul's opening defense and commanded those who stood by him "to strike him on the mouth". Paul described him as a "whitewashed wall" and testified that God would strike Ananias for this unlawful act. Those who stood by accused Paul of reviling or insulting the High Priest, to which Paul replied that he did not know that he (or it) was the High Priest. Seeing that there were both Pharisees and Sadducees on the Sanhedrin (see  for the whole context):

But when Paul perceived that one part were Sadducees and the other Pharisees, he cried out in the council, "Men and brethren, I am a Pharisee, the son of a Pharisee; concerning the hope and resurrection of the dead I am being judged!" (Acts 23:6, NKJV)

Barker commented "It is not evident how it was that Paul failed to know the thing that he said he did not know - whether this were that Ananias was the high priest, or whether it were that it was Ananias who uttered the command to smite him on the mouth". Gill identified Joshua ben Gamla (fl. c.64–65 CE) as the reigning high priest during Paul's trial, for one possible explanation of the latter's remark.

Quadratus, governor of Syria, accused Ananias of being responsible for acts of violence. Ananias was sent to Rome for trial (52 CE), but was acquitted by the emperor Claudius. He continued to officiate as high priest until 58 CE. 

Being a friend of the Romans, Ananias was murdered by the people at the beginning of the First Jewish-Roman War.

His son Eliezar ben Hanania was one of the leaders of the Great Revolt of Judea.

See also
List of biblical figures identified in extra-biblical sources

References

1st-century High Priests of Israel
People in Acts of the Apostles
Religious leaders of the Roman Empire
Sanhedrin